The Beijing–Harbin high-speed railway is an operational high-speed railway corridor, announced in 2008 as part of the "Four Verticals and Four Horizontals" master railway network plan. It is part of the CRH's system of passenger dedicated lines, connecting Beijing Chaoyang railway station in Beijing and Harbin railway station in Harbin.

The distance between Beijing and Harbin in  after opening of this section in Jan 2022. It comprises the sections: Harbin–Dalian high-speed railway, the Beijing–Shenyang high-speed railway, and the Panjin–Yingkou high-speed railway.

Components
The main route of the Beijing–Harbin high-speed railway begins as the Beijing–Shenyang high-speed railway to the city of Shenyang. At Shenyang, the main route continues as part of the Harbin–Dalian high-speed railway, which travels from Harbin to Dalian via Shenyang. The remaining section of the Harbin–Dalian high-speed railway between Shenyang and Dalian serves as a branch route to Dalian as well as Yingkou, which is one of the termini of the Panjin–Yingkou high-speed railway. Here the Panjin–Yingkou high-speed railway is a short branch to the city of Panjin. At Panjin, the railway connects to the Qinhuangdao–Shenyang high-speed railway, which is part of the Beijing–Harbin Railway.

Station list

Harbin–Dalian section

Beijing–Shenyang section

References

High-speed railway lines in China
Standard gauge railways in China